This is a list of episodes for Kaijudo, an American animated television series created by Hasbro Studios. It premiered on June 2, 2012, and a first 3-part, half hour, back-to-back episode sneak preview was shown on May 5, 2012.

Series overview
{| class="wikitable"
|-
! colspan="2"|Season
! Episodes
! First aired
! Last aired
|- style="text-align:center;" 
| style="background:#788DFF; color:#100;" | 
| [[List of Kaijudo episodes#Season 1 (Kaijudo: Rise of the Duel Masters, 2012)|1]]
| 26
| 
| 
|- style="text-align:center;" 
| style="background:#FF5F5F; color:#100;" | 
| [[List of Kaijudo episodes#Season 2 (Kaijudo: Clash of the Duel Masters, 2013)|2]]
| 26
| 
| 
|}

Episodes

Season 1 (Kaijudo: Rise of the Duel Masters, 2012)

Season 2 (Kaijudo: Clash of the Duel Masters, 2013)

Home media
Shout! Factory began releasing the series in December 2012.  United Kingdom-based Clear Vision has rights for the first two seasons through Region 2, including most of Western Europe and the Middle East.

References

Kaijudo